The Greenfield Recorder is an American daily newspaper published Monday through Saturday mornings in Greenfield, Massachusetts, covering all of Franklin County, Massachusetts. It is owned by Newspapers of New England, which also owns its neighbor to the south, the Daily Hampshire Gazette of Northampton, Massachusetts.

As the Greenfield area's only newspaper of record, The Recorder is the primary source of local news in Franklin County.  Originally published in 1792, the paper is the one of the oldest daily newspapers in the United States, and the second oldest daily in Massachusetts after the Daily Hampshire Gazette.

References

External links
 

Mass media in Franklin County, Massachusetts
Newspapers published in Massachusetts
Publications established in 1792
Greenfield, Massachusetts
1792 establishments in Massachusetts